Time's Arrow may refer to:
"Time's Arrow" (short story), a 1950 short story by Arthur C. Clarke
Time's Arrow (novel), a 1991 novel by Martin Amis
"Time's Arrow" (Star Trek: The Next Generation), a 1992 two-part episode of Star Trek: The Next Generation
Time's Arrow (EP), a 2011 release by the American artist Prurient
Time's Arrow, a 2012 orchestral work by English composer Anthony Payne
"Time's Arrow" (BoJack Horseman), a 2017 episode of BoJack Horseman
Time's Arrow (album), a 2023 album by the English electronic music band Ladytron

See also
 Arrow of time, a direction of time on a four-dimensional relativistic map of the world (as per Arthur Eddington)
 Time's Arrow, Time's Cycle, a 1987 book by Stephen Jay Gould